The Ōkārito River is a river of the West Coast Region of New Zealand's South Island. It flows northwest from the northern end of Lake Mapourika, reaching the Ōkārito Lagoon 15 kilometres west of Whataroa.

See also
List of rivers of New Zealand

References

Rivers of the West Coast, New Zealand
Westland District
Rivers of New Zealand